The Dundee Stars are a professional ice hockey team based in the Scottish city of Dundee. They were formed in 2001 and play their home games at the Dundee Ice Arena, situated off the city's main Kingsway dual carriageway. The current title sponsor of the team is 'Trade-Mart'.

The team currently play in the top professional UK-wide Elite Ice Hockey League and have previously played in others including the British National League (BNL),  Scottish National League (SNL) and The Northern League.
In joining the Elite League (EIHL), they are one of three Scottish teams playing in the competition, alongside Glasgow Clan and Fife Flyers.

History

BNL years
Founded in 2001, the Dundee Stars won the Findus British National League (FBNL) and the Playoffs in their first season (2001–02) and then ranked 2nd in the FBNL 9n (2002–03), topped their playoff group and reached the semi-finals of the challenge cup the following season. Stars' third season was a disappointment compared to the previous two, with a low league position and a place in the final of the Capital Cup.

Season 2004–05 started off disappointing for all three Scottish teams in the BNL. The National Cup, the Keyline Cup and the Challenge Cup were no better. However, the Stars turned their season around after making a few changes to the roster and won the Playoffs and also fared well in the Caledonia Cup.

Post BNL years: SNL
In 2005 Edinburgh Capitals and Newcastle Vipers decided to resign from the BNL in order to join the premier Elite League. As this would leave the BNL with only five teams; and thus with little option but to fold, the Capitals and Vipers temporarily withdrew their applications so as to allow the remaining BNL teams to apply for EIHL status. However, terms could not be agreed between the EIHL and the remaining five BNL teams; leading the Capitals and Vipers to resubmit their original applications and join the EIHL; which ultimately resulted in the closure of the BNL. This led the Stars, along with fellow former BNL team Fife Flyers, to move to the Scottish National League. The Stars refusal of the EIHL's terms was due to their local rival, Fife Flyers, being unable to join the EIHL due to their arena not meeting the EIHL's standards. It was decided that Stars' would not join the EIHL at that time unless the Flyers were allowed to join with them. In joining the SNL the Stars had to release all of their imported players in order to meet SNL rules.

During the first season, Fife won the SNL with Stars three points behind in 2nd. Flyers also won the Autumn Cup, the Northern League and the SNL Playoffs. Season 2006–07 introduced the NHL style Zero Tolerance rules and the one import rule with the intent of making the SNL a more skillful league. The Stars have relied heavily on their junior development with many under-19s and some under-16s "playing up" as well as managing to secure the services of two of the "old" favourites, Jeff Marshall (Canada) and Patric Lochi (Italy).

EIHL years
In late April 2010, the Dundee Stars confirmed that they had been accepted into the EIHL, as the league's 2nd expansion team for the 2010–11 season.

Elite Ice Hockey League record

† Note: The 2019–20 Elite League season was cancelled completely in March 2020, owing to the coronavirus pandemic. The season finished without a league or play-off winner and Dundee's stat line above reflects the Stars' position at the time of the cancellation.

†† Note: The 2020–21 Elite League season - originally scheduled for a revised start date of 5 December - was suspended on 15 September 2020, because of ongoing coronavirus pandemic restrictions. The EIHL board determined that the season was non-viable without supporters being permitted to attend matches and unanimously agreed to a suspension. The season was cancelled completely in February 2021.

Head coach history

Current squad 
Squad for 2022–23 Elite League season

* Denotes two-way deal with Dundee Comets of the SNL
** Denotes two-way deal with Solway Sharks of the NIHL 1

Honours
British National League
 League: 2001–02
 Playoffs: 2001–02, 2004–05

Scottish National League
 Autumn Cup: 2009

Elite Ice Hockey League
 Gardiner Conference: 2013–14

Individual
EIHL All-Stars

First Team 
2013–14: Dan Bakala
2016–17: Vinny Scarsella
Second Team 
2012–13: Nicola Riopel, Sami Ryhänen
2013–14: Rory Rawlyk, Nico Sacchetti
2016–17: Felix-Antoine Poulin
2019–20: Drydn Dow
2021–22: Charlie Combs

References

External links
 

Ice hockey teams in Scotland
Sport in Dundee
Elite Ice Hockey League teams
Ice hockey clubs established in 2001
2001 establishments in Scotland